Shiny may refer to gloss (optics), the ability of a surface to reflect light in a specular way.

Film and television
 "Shiny", an episode of the TV series The Pinky and Perky Show
 Shiny, a character in the TV series Dinosaur Train
 Shiny, a character in the film Saving Santa

Music
 Shiny, a 1999 album by Kari Wuhrer
 Shiny, a 2005 album by The Bang
 "Shiny", a song on the 2001 EP 5 Songs by the Decemberists
 "Shiny" a song from the 2016 Disney film Moana

People
 Shiny Abraham (born 1965), an Indian athlete
 Shiny Dixit (born 1991), an Indian television actress
 Shiny Doshi, an Indian television actress and model

Other uses
 Shiny Entertainment, a former American video game developer
 Shiny (software), an R package for developing web applications

See also

 Shiny Joe Ryan (born 1987), an Australian musician
 "Shiny, Shiny", a 1983 song by British pop band Haysi Fantayzee
 Shinee, South Korean boy band